Min Nyo San was the father of King Alaungpaya, the founder of the Konbaung Dynasty of Burma (Myanmar). He was the mayor (headman) of Moksobo, and descended from the family that governed the Mu valley since the 15th century. He was awarded the royal title "Thiri Maha Dhamma Yaza" after his son became king.

References

Bibliography
 

Konbaung dynasty